General Rashad Mahmood NI(M), is a retired four-star army general in the Pakistan Army who served as the 15th Chairman Joint Chiefs of Staff Committee. He was appointed as Chairman Joint Chiefs of Staff Committee of Pakistan by prime minister Nawaz Sharif on November 27, 2013. He retired on November 27, 2016.

Biography

He was commissioned in 1979 in 7th Battalion of the Baloch Regiment. He is from Arian family.

He attended a Company Commander course in France and is a graduate of the Canadian Army Command and Staff College, National Defence University, Pakistan. He has varied experience of command, staff and instructional appointments. His major appointments include Platoon Commander, Pakistan Military Academy, Brigade Major Infantry Brigade, Instructor at Command and Staff College and National Defence University. He has remained Chief of Staff of Bahawalpur Corps and Military Secretary to the President.

Mahmood has commanded two infantry battalions, two infantry brigades and a United Nations contingent in Congo, Infantry Division at Sialkot, Director General at Inter-Service Intelligence Directorate, Islamabad and Commander 4 Corps (Lahore). After commanding the Corps, he took over as Chief of General Staff (Pakistan) in January 2013. He has been conferred with Hilal-i-Imtiaz (Military) and Nishan-e-Imtiaz (military).

References

|-
 

Living people
Chairmen Joint Chiefs of Staff Committee
National Defence University, Pakistan alumni
Punjabi people
Recipients of Nishan-e-Imtiaz
Recipients of Hilal-i-Imtiaz
Baloch Regiment officers
Year of birth missing (living people)